Technical support (abbreviated as tech support) is a call centre type customer service provided by companies to advise and assist registered users with issues concerning their technical products. Traditionally done on the phone, technical support can now be conducted online or through chat. At present, most large and mid-size companies have outsourced their tech support operations. Many companies provide discussion boards for users of their products to interact; such forums allow companies to reduce their support costs without losing the benefit of customer feedback.

Outsourcing tech support
With the increasing use of technology in modern times, there is a growing requirement to provide technical support. Many organizations locate their technical support departments or call centers in countries or regions with lower costs. Dell was amongst the first companies to outsource their technical support and customer service departments to India in 2001.  There has also been a growth in companies specializing in providing technical support to other organizations. These are often referred to as MSPs (Managed Service Providers).

For businesses needing to provide technical support, outsourcing allows them to maintain high availability of service. Such need may result from peaks in call volumes during the day, periods of high activity due to the introduction of new products or maintenance service packs, or the requirement to provide customers with a high level of service at a low cost to the business. For businesses needing technical support assets, outsourcing enables their core employees to focus more on their work in order to maintain productivity.  It also enables them to utilize specialized personnel whose technical knowledge base and experience may exceed the scope of the business, thus providing a higher level of technical support to their employees.

Multi-level tech support 
Technical support is often subdivided into tiers, or levels, in order to better serve a business or customer base. The number of levels a business uses to organize their technical support group is dependent on the business's needs regarding their ability to sufficiently serve their customers or users. The reason for providing a multi-tiered support system instead of one general support group is to provide the best possible service in the most efficient possible manner. Success of the organizational structure is dependent on the technicians' understanding of their level of responsibility and commitments, their customer response time commitments, and when to appropriately escalate an issue and to which level. A common support structure revolves around a three-tiered technical support system. Remote computer repair is a method for troubleshooting software related problems via remote desktop connections.

L1 Support
The first job of a Tier I specialist is to gather the customer's information and to determine the customer's issue by analyzing the symptoms and figuring out the underlying problem. When analyzing the symptoms, it is important for the technician to identify what the customer is trying to accomplish so that time is not wasted on "attempting to solve a symptom instead of a problem."

Once identification of the underlying problem is established, the specialist can begin sorting through the possible solutions available. Technical support specialists in this group typically handle straightforward and simple problems while "possibly using some kind of knowledge management tool." This includes troubleshooting methods such as verifying physical layer issues, resolving username and password problems, uninstalling/reinstalling basic software applications, verification of proper hardware and software set up, and assistance with navigating around application menus. Personnel at this level have a basic to general understanding of the product or service and may not always contain the competency required for solving complex issues. Nevertheless, the goal for this group is to handle 70–80% of the user problems before finding it necessary to escalate the issue to a higher level.

L2 Support
Tier II (or Level 2, abbreviated as T2 or L2) is a more in-depth technical support level than Tier I and therefore costs more as the technicians are more experienced and knowledgeable on a particular product or service. It is synonymous with level 2 support, support line 2, administrative level support, and various other headings denoting advanced technical troubleshooting and analysis methods. Technicians in this realm of knowledge are responsible for assisting Tier I personnel in solving basic technical problems and for investigating elevated issues by confirming the validity of the problem and seeking for known solutions related to these more complex issues. However, prior to the troubleshooting process, it is important that the technician review the work order to see what has already been accomplished by the Tier I technician and how long the technician has been working with the particular customer. This is a key element in meeting both the customer and business needs as it allows the technician to prioritize the troubleshooting process and properly manage their time.

If a problem is new and/or personnel from this group cannot determine a solution, they are responsible for elevating this issue to the Tier III technical support group. In addition, many companies may specify that certain troubleshooting solutions be performed by this group to help ensure the intricacies of a challenging issue are solved by providing experienced and knowledgeable technicians. This may include, but is not limited to, onsite installations or replacement of various hardware components, software repair, diagnostic testing, or the utilization of remote control tools to take over the user's machine for the sole purpose of troubleshooting and finding a solution to the problem.

L3 Support
Tier III (or Level 3, abbreviated as T3 or L3) is the highest level of support in a three-tiered technical support model responsible for handling the most difficult or advanced problems. It is synonymous with level 3 support, 3rd line support, back-end support, support line 3, high-end support, and various other headings denoting expert level troubleshooting and analysis methods. These individuals are experts in their fields and are responsible for not only assisting both Tier I and Tier II personnel, but with the research and development of solutions to new or unknown issues. Note that Tier III technicians have the same responsibility as Tier II technicians in reviewing the work order and assessing the time already spent with the customer so that the work is prioritized and time management is sufficiently utilized. If it is at all possible, the technician will work to solve the problem with the customer as it may become apparent that the Tier I and/or Tier II technicians simply failed to discover the proper solution. Upon encountering new problems, however, Tier III personnel must first determine whether or not to solve the problem and may require the customer's contact information so that the technician can have adequate time to troubleshoot the issue and find a solution. It is typical for a developer or someone who knows the code or backend of the product, to be the Tier 3 support person.

In some instances, an issue may be so problematic to the point where the product cannot be salvaged and must be replaced. Such extreme problems are also sent to the original developers for in-depth analysis. If it is determined that a problem can be solved, this group is responsible for designing and developing one or more courses of action, evaluating each of these courses in a test case environment, and implementing the best solution to the problem. While not universally used, a fourth level often represents an escalation point beyond the organization. L4 support is generally a hardware or software vendor.

Scams

A common scam typically involves a cold caller claiming to be from a technical support department of a company like Microsoft. Such cold calls are often made from call centers based in India to users in English-speaking countries, although increasingly these scams operate within the same country. The scammer will instruct the user to download a remote desktop program and once connected, use social engineering techniques that typically involve Windows components to persuade the victim that they need to pay in order for the computer to be fixed and then proceeds to steal money from the victim's credit card.

See also
Call center
Call board 
Customer service
Comparison of issue-tracking systems
Comparison of help desk issue tracking software 
Help desk 
Help desk software

References 

Help desk
Outsourcing
Customer service
Computer telephony integration
Computer occupations
Remote desktop 
Telephony